Khamosh Nigahen is a 1986 Bollywood film. It stars Rakesh Roshan and Deepti Naval in lead roles.

Music
Lyricist: Ravi

References

External links
 

1986 films
1980s Hindi-language films
Films scored by Ravi